TJM may refer to:

 Kampo, also known as traditional Japanese medicine (TJM)
 Roschino International Airport, IATA Code TJM
 The Juice Media, an Australian company that produces political and social satire
 Trade Justice Movement, a British coalition campaigning for trade justice